Frederick Engel (Fre) Jeltsema (Uithuizen, 4 October 1879 - The Hague, 16 February 1971) was a Dutch painter and sculptor.

Because of a medical uncertainty at birth, Jeltsema was registered as a girl in the municipality's population registry. This was administratively corrected in 1906.

In 1892–1896 Jeltsema followed a course at the Minerva Academy in Groningen. He then followed an initial training for drawing teacher, but opted for training as a sculptor at the Rijksakademie van beeldende kunsten in Amsterdam (1899–1902). In 1902 he won the Dutch Prix de Rome.

1879 births
1971 deaths
Dutch male sculptors
People from Eemsmond
Prix de Rome (Netherlands) winners
20th-century Dutch painters
Dutch male painters
20th-century Dutch sculptors
20th-century Dutch male artists